Wittocossus is a genus of moths in the family Cossidae.

Species
 Wittocossus dellabrunai Saldaitis & Ivinskis, 2010
 Wittocossus mokanshanensis (Daniel, 1945)

References

 , 2010: Wittocossus dellabrunai (Lepidoptera, Cossidae), a new species from China. Esperiana Buchreihe zur Entomologie 15: 383-386.
 , 2004: Cossidae of Thailand. Part 1. (Lepidoptera: Cossidae). Atalanta 35 (3-4): 335-351.
 , 2006, New Cossidae (Lepidoptera) from Asia, Africa and Macronesia, Tinea 19 (3): 188-213.
 , 2009: The Carpenter Moths (Lepidoptera:Cossidae) of Vietnam. Entomofauna Supplement 16: 11-32.

External links
Natural History Museum Lepidoptera generic names catalog

Cossinae